Galacidalacidesoxiribunucleicacid (also known as Homage to Crick and Watson (Discoverers of DNA)) is a 1963 painting by Salvador Dalí. The painting's title is a portmanteau of the name of Dalí's wife, Gala Dalí, and deoxyribonucleic acid (DNA). It is a tribute to Francis Crick and James D. Watson, who determined the double helical structure of DNA in 1953.

The painting is in the collection of the Salvador Dalí Museum in St. Petersburg, Florida.

History
The painting was commissioned by the New England National Bank of Boston. It was exhibited at Knoedler in 1963 from November 26 to December 26. In the exhibition catalogue, Dalí declared that:

Composition
Gala Dalí is depicted in the foreground of the painting, with her back to the viewer.

Analysis
In a note describing the work, Dalí mused that the double helix is "the only structure linking man to God." This is one of 13 large paintings Dali produced. On the right hand side there are riflemen arranged to form "cubes of death". Within each "cube of death" their rifles aim at each other's head, thus if one of them shoots it will trigger the reaction of the other three, and they will all shoot killing each other. According to Dali, these cubes also represent the cubic structure of one of the most familiar substances, table salt or sodium chloride. However, the crystal structure of NaCl is cubic all-face centered rather than cubic primitive, thus there is a scientific inconsistency.

"The prophet Isaiah appears at the top left holding a scroll inscribed with the title
of the painting—Galacidalacidesoxiribunucleicacid. It combines a string of words
that decodes the meaning of the work. The first word in the string is Gala, Dalí‘s
wife and muse. The word ―"cid" refers to a Spanish folklore hero, and Allah is the
Arabic word for God. The last word in the string is Dalí‘s spelling of the full
scientific name for DNA—desoxiribunucleicacid."[4]

References

Bibliography
 

1963 paintings
Paintings by Salvador Dalí
Science in art
Paintings in St. Petersburg, Florida
James Watson